Raushan Meshitkhanova born  is a Kazakh weightlifter, most recently competing in the 81 kg division at the 2018 World Weightlifting Championships.

Career
She won the silver medal in the snatch at the 2018 World Weightlifting Championships in the 81 kg division.

Major results

References

Kazakhstani female weightlifters
Living people
1995 births
World Weightlifting Championships medalists